The Hjelm Range is a mountain range in the Gauss Peninsula, King Christian X Land, northeastern Greenland. Administratively this range is part of the Northeast Greenland National Park zone.

The range was named by the 1931 - 1934 Three-year Expedition to East Greenland following a suggestion by expedition member Thyge Johansen, who said that the rounded mountaintops reminded him of the helmets worn by Roman soldiers.

Geography
The Hjelm Range is a mountain chain located in the southern part of the Gauss Peninsula stretching roughly from NW to SE along the coast of the Kaiser Franz Joseph Fjord. The area of the Hjelm mountains is uninhabited.

Mountains

 Bøggild Bjerg
 Gunnbjörnfjellet
 Harder Bjerg 
 Langbjerg
 Smith Woodward Bjerg
 Stensiø Bjerg
 Torkjellfjellet

See also
List of mountain ranges of Greenland

References

External links 
Tertiary volcanism in northern E Greenland: Gauss Halvø and Hold with Hope
Mountain ranges of Greenland